Dwight Johnson Porter (April 12, 1916 – June 4, 2006) was a United States diplomat.

Biography

Dwight J. Porter was born in Shawnee, Oklahoma on April 12, 1916, the son of Dwight and Gertrude Johnson Porter.  During World War II, he served in the United States Marine Corps 1942–45.  He married Adele Ritchie on October 6, 1942 (shortly before his deployment with the Marines) in Omaha, Nebraska, and together the couple had three sons and three daughters.

After the war, Porter worked for the Displaced Persons Commission from 1945 to 1949.  He was then a Foreign Service Officer posted in Frankfurt am Main 1949–54, then in London 1954–56.  He spent 1956-59 in Washington, D.C., at the State Department's Economics Bureau, then returned to the field, spending 1959–63 in Vienna.

In 1963, President of the United States John F. Kennedy named Porter Assistant Secretary of State for Administration and, after Senate confirmation, Porter held this position from October 2, 1963 until March 28, 1965.

In 1965, President Lyndon B. Johnson named Porter United States Ambassador to Lebanon, and he held this post from June 22, 1965 until September 12, 1970.  He was thus Ambassador to Lebanon during the Six Days War, and later commented publicly about the USS Liberty incident.

In the early 1970s, Porter was the U.S.'s Resident Representative to the International Atomic Energy Agency.

After leaving government service, Porter worked as an executive at the Westinghouse Electric Company.

In retirement, Porter split his time between Lake Forest, Illinois and Rancho Mirage, California.  He died in Rancho Mirage of complications from a stroke on June 4, 2006, aged 90.

References

1916 births
2006 deaths
United States Assistant Secretaries of State
Ambassadors of the United States to Lebanon
United States Marine Corps personnel of World War II
United States Foreign Service personnel